{{subst:proposed deletion|concern=inadequate 3rd party sources}}

United Synagogue Youth (USY) is the youth movement of the United Synagogue of Conservative Judaism (USCJ). It was founded in 1951, under the auspices of the Youth Commission of what was then the United Synagogue of America.

USY operates in the United States and Canada, with 350 chapters across 15 regions. Kadima (Hebrew for "Forward") is USY's program for grades 5 to 8 (varies by region).

History
Under the leadership of both Rabbi David Aronson and Rabbi Kassel Abelson, the first USY chapter was founded at Beth El Synagogue in Minneapolis in 1948 to provide for the social and spiritual needs of its teens. Soon, other synagogues began following suit.

“The Youth Commission unanimously agrees that the teenage groups come under the general supervision of the Youth Commission. Teenage groups should include boys and girls of high school level, 13 to 17 years inclusive…The Youth Commission shall concern itself with non-scholastic group work for teenagers.” With these words, on March 19, 1951, USY was formed nationally at its first convention, bringing together delegates from synagogues and other youth groups across the country, along with lay and professional youth workers of USCJ. All told, more than 500 people, representing 65 communities from 14 states and Canada attended the first official meeting of USY. At that convening, under the leadership of the newly elected national president, Paul Freedman, the two basic documents of the organization, Aims and Objectives and the USY Constitution, were adopted.

In 1956, the Two-o-Nine tzedakah (charity) project began (later revamped to become Tikun Olam (Repairing the World), the social action/charity project that all contemporary USYers recognize).

That same summer, twelve USYers went on the first organization sponsored trip to Israel. Known as the USY Israel Summer Pilgrimage, it became the first of the USY summer programs. Two years later, Pilgrimage enrollment had already increased to 100 teens. In 1961, USY further expanded its summer programs when two staff members took four USYers on their “Schlep and Pray Across the USA,” the first USY on Wheels trip.

In 1969, the Youth Commission created Kadima, the youth group for middle school and junior high students.

USY has 350 local chapters in 15 regions across North America.

Structure and leadership
USY has three main levels of entry into the organization: chapter, regional, and international. The HaNegev and METNY regions are also split into sub-regions and divisions, respectively.

Chapter
Chapters, typically run out of local USCJ congregations, provide programming on the local level. This includes social, religious, educational, and community service-based programming. Social programming ranges from lounge and movie nights to pool parties and paintballing. Religious, educational, and community service-based programming include mock-seders, Israel education, and volunteering.

All programming is planned by the chapter's executive and general boards with the guidance of the chapter's advisor. Typically, a given chapter's name is an acronym of the synagogue or city in which the chapter is based followed by the letters "USY". Congregation Beth Judea, for example, would be shortened to BJUSY. All chapters are associated with a USCJ-affiliated synagogue.

Regional
Regions consist of chapters in the same geographical area. Regions gather for bi-monthly, quarterly, and annual regional events, such as weekend-long kinnusim (conventions) and week-long encampments. There are 15 USY regions.

Each region has a Regional Executive Board (REB), which serves as the region's cabinet, tending to its needs across the year. An REB typically consists of a President, and five Vice Presidents: Israel Affairs VP (IA), Religion/Education VP (Rel/Ed), Social Action/Tikun Olam VP (SA/TO), Membership/Kadima VP (Mem/Kad), and Communications VP (Comm). Some regions incorporate an Executive Vice President and/or Parliamentarian position. In regions that have Divisions or Sub-Regions, Divisional or Sub-Regional Presidents are automatically granted REB member status.

Sub-Regional/Divisional
Larger USY regions are occasionally split into sub-regions or divisions. The sub-regions and divisions act much like regions, overseeing their respective chapters, and holding their own conventions and elections. Currently, there are two regions, HaNegev and METNY, with sub-regions or divisions. HaNegev's sub-regions are each led by a three-person executive board, and METNY's divisions are each led by a six-person executive board.  HaNegev's three sub-regions are Arvot (South Florida), Mercaz (North and Central Florida), and Ein Gedi (Florida Panhandle, Georgia, Alabama, Mississippi, Tennessee, North Carolina, and South Carolina). METNY's three (previously four) divisions are Emek (Hudson Valley), Sababa (Manhattan, Queens, and Brooklyn), and Ruach (Long Island).

Branches
In the spring of 2019, USY combined regions into branches. There are six branches. Each region maintains its individual regional identity, but the leadership has shifted to one team running two to three regions.

International
USY holds an International Convention (IC), the largest gathering of Conservative Jewish teens in North America, and runs summer trips across the United States, Canada, Israel, and Europe.

The six-person International Executive Board (IEB) includes a president and five vice presidents. The committees of the International General Board (IGB) are appointed and overseen by the IEB. The IEB is elected by voting delegates at the International Convention every December and the members serve for one calendar year, unlike chapter and regional boards which are elected at regional conventions each spring.

Programs

USY Summer Experience
USY runs simultaneous four-to-seven-week summer programs across North America and Europe. The trips through Europe culminate in Israel.

USY on Wheels is a six-week bus tour throughout the continental United States, Canada, and Alaska. Participants spend the summer visiting America's greatest landmarks, including the Grand Canyon and Pier 39, as well as the country's more obscure destinations including the Corn Palace and Wall Drug. The program's goal is giving teens the opportunity to understand what it means to live Jewishly no matter where you go. Participants stay in both hotels and home hospitality. Participants keep Kosher and pause to celebrate Shabbat throughout the summer. In addition to the "Classic" Wheels trip, other travel options include:
 Wheels East, a four-week east coast trip exclusively for 7th and 8th grades
 Wheels West, a four-week west coast trip exclusively for 7th and 8th graders
 Pacific Northwest, a three-week trip that includes two-weeks on the West Coast and a one-week Alaskan cruise
USY's trips to Israel, USY Israel Pilgrimage, consist of an optional week in Poland or Eastern Europe followed by a month in Israel, learning about Jewish communities and the Shoah (Holocaust). Pilgrimage trips visit every major city and region, including Jerusalem, Tel Aviv, Haifa, Tiberias, Beersheba, and Eilat. In addition to city life, the program incorporates many hiking opportunities and outdoor experiences, in areas including the Golan Heights, the Jordan River, the Galilee the Mediterranean Sea, Masada, the Dead Sea, the Negev, the Red Sea, and archaeological digs of ancient Jewish civilization, all led by professional tour guides. Another option for Israel Pilgrimage is L'Takayn Olam, a program that blends social action and volunteering with sightseeing.

USY also partners with the DREAM Project for DREAM USY, a two-week social action trip in the Dominican Republic.

International Convention
USY's International Convention, commonly referred to as IC, is the largest gathering of Conservative Jewish teens.

Held annually the last full week in December, the convention moves to a different North American city each year and convenes hundreds of Jewish teens for five days of celebration, friendship, Jewish learning, and giving back to the local community.

The location changes from year to year, covering several USY regions over a period of a few years.
The 2016 International Convention was held in Dallas, Texas (SWUSY Region) on December 25–29, 2016. During the week of the Convention, USYers participated in community service, leadership, religious, educational, cultural, and social programming. The 2017 International Convention was held in Chicago, Illinois. The 2019 International Convention took place in Ontario, California. The 2021 International Convention will be held in Washington DC.

Interest clubs
USY offers three interest clubs for USY members.

The Abraham Joshua Heschel Honor Society is a club for USY members of secular and religious academic excellence. The club is named after prominent theologian and activist Abraham Joshua Heschel. Members meet during regional conventions to discuss topics that Heschel wrote about. The Heschel Honor society holds an annual three-day, text-focused convention every March. The Heschel Honor Society recognizes USYers committed to the study of Torah, prayer, and performance of G’milut Chasadim (acts of loving kindness).

Chalutzim is the USY Israel advocacy club, helping  relationship developments with the Jewish homeland through programming, workshops, and fun activities. In Hebrew, Chalutzim means “pioneers,” referring to the original settlers in modern-day Israel.

613 Mitzvah Corps (commonly referred to as 613) is USY's Social Action/Tikun Olam (Repairing the World) or SA/TO club. The club was designed for USYers who wish to be more involved in social action and learn more about social activism within the context of Judaism.

List of regions

See also
 Kadima - the pre-high-school program of USY
 Camp Ramah - a network of Conservative Jewish summer camps across North America and Israel
 Nativ - the post-high-school gap year program operated by USCJ
 United Synagogue of Conservative Judaism - the organization of Conservative Jewish synagogues in North America
 Koach - a now-defunct, college campus organization affiliated with Conservative Judaism
 Conservative Judaism - a leading modern denomination of Judaism
 Judaism - the religion of the Jewish people

References

External links
 United Synagogue Youth Official website

Conservative Judaism in North America
Conservative Judaism in New York (state)
Jewish youth organizations
Youth organizations based in the United States